Jarrah is an Arabic-language word for surgeon.

Whereas in Dekhani-Urdu the word Jarrah is termed for the Orthopaedists who are trained in the discipline of Unani medicine.

In South India and particularly Hyderabad, India Jarrah are the bone setters, adjust joint dislocations and physiotherapists, they  use non-surgical means to treat fractures, dislocation, sports injuries and set the bone without applying any plaster. Jarrah do not rely on latest technology of treatment  like X-ray or any diagnosis and uses the art of treating orthopaedic problems with bare hands and supplementing it with regular essential oil massages and specially prepared Unani medicine pastes, this is a long-term treatment, with minimum 3 weeks depending on the seriousness of case.

References

External links
 Traditional bone setters unfazed by orthopaedists
 

Islam in India
History of medieval medicine
Traditional healthcare occupations
Unani medicine
Arabic-language names
Healthcare in Hyderabad, India